USCGC Donald Horsley (WPC-1117) is the United States Coast Guard's 17th . She was commissioned on May 20, 2016.  She was the fifth of a cohort of six FRCs home-ported in San Juan, Puerto Rico.

Namesake
In 2010, Master Chief Petty Officer of the Coast Guard Charles "Skip" W. Bowen, the U.S. Coast Guard's senior enlisted person at the time, lobbied for the new Sentinel-class cutters to be named after enlisted Coast Guardsmen, or personnel from its precursor services, who had distinguished themselves by their heroism.
Donald R. Horsley rose to the rank of Master Chief, retiring with eleven service stripes, indicating 44 years of service.  He served in three wars, and received multiple awards for valor.

References

External links

Donald Horsley
2016 ships
Ships built in Lockport, Louisiana